Konstantinos Manthos (born 16 October 1965) is a Greek sailor. He competed in the Star event at the 1988 Summer Olympics.

References

External links
 

1965 births
Living people
Greek male sailors (sport)
Olympic sailors of Greece
Sailors at the 1988 Summer Olympics – Star
Place of birth missing (living people)